The Westfield Health Sheffield Hatters are a Women's Basketball club from Sheffield, England, who play their home games at All Saints Catholic High School's Sports Centre.  The club have been mainstays of the women's game in England for many years, having celebrated their 50th anniversary in 2011, and are founder members of the professional Women's British Basketball League, which launched in 2014.

History

Founded in 1961,by Betty Codona OBE (1938-2022), the club's early years saw them compete primarily in local competition, although they did compete regularly in the Women's National Cup when this launched, making an appearance in the inaugural final in 1965.  The Hatters first entered the Women's National Basketball League in 1977, joining the league in Division 2 (North).  After their first season, the club accepted a place in the expanding Division 1, but failed to win a single game in two seasons in Division 1, leading to them dropping back down to the regional division.

In 1984, the club were promoted back to the top flight as Division 2 (North) Champions, after which they began a period of steadily strengthening their position, reaching the end-of-series playoffs for the first time in 1988 and claiming their first league title in 1991.  The best was still to come though, as the team won their first League, Playoff and Cup triple in 1993, and went through two entire seasons undefeated between 1995 and 1997, claiming every major honour along the way.  The 1990s represented a golden age of dominance for the club, claiming both the league title and National Cup nine out of ten times, and adding six of the ten playoff titles to that number.

Throughout the years, the club had played at a variety of venues, and attempts began to find a more permanent home in the early 2000s, when the club briefly relocated to the English Institute of Sport in Sheffield, sharing the venue with the City of Sheffield Arrows.  However, the size and cost of the venue prompted a further move to the All Saints Catholic High School's Sports Centre in 2005, where they have remained ever since.  While not quite up to the standard set in the previous decade, the 2000s still saw overwhelmingly strong results for the club, only once finishing outside the top three in any of the major tournaments.  (A quarter-final defeat in the National Cup in 2000.)

With the London 2012 Olympics bringing extra exposure to basketball in the country, one of the Hatters' former players Jenaya Wade-Fray took to the court as part of Team GB.  The club were also invited to join the professional Women's British Basketball League in 2014, giving a new stage for the club to continue their leadership of the women's game, both on and off the court.

Honours

Over their long history, the club have collected an enviable array of national titles, including winning the 'clean sweep' of League, National Cup and Playoffs on no less than ten occasions.  The club have also won a variety of local, junior and masters titles, which are listed on their website.

Women's British Basketball League
Winners (1): 2014-15.
WBBL Play-offs
Winner's (1): 2014-15.
WBBL Trophy
Winner's  (2): 2014-2015, 2015-2016
WBBL Cup
Winner's  (2): 2016-2017, 2018-2019
NBL / EBL Division 1 League Champions
 1990, 1991, 1992, 1993, 1994, 1995, 1996, 1997, 1998, 1999, 2000, 2001, 2002, 2003, 2006, 2007, 2008, 2009, 2010, 2011, 2013, 2014
NBL / EBL Division 1 Playoff Champions
 1993, 1995, 1996, 1997, 1998, 1999, 2000, 2001, 2002, 2003, 2004, 2006, 2007, 2009, 2011, 2012, 2013
National Cup Champions
 1990, 1991, 1992, 1993, 1994, 1995, 1996, 1997, 1999, 2002, 2007, 2009, 2010, 2011, 2012, 2013
National Trophy Champions
 1984
NBL Division 2 (North) League Champions
 1984

Season-by-season records

 In the 2002-2003 season the WNBL Conference operated as the top-flight league, ahead of Division One.
 In 2003 the NBL was replaced by the EBL, which reinstated Division One as the top flight.
 One match in the 2012-2013 season against Newham Stars was declared void.

Players

Current roster

Depth chart

Notable former players
  Jenaya Wade-Fray

References

External links
Sheffield Hatters (Official Site)
Westfield Health (Official Sponsor)
Official site of the Women's British Basketball League

Women's basketball teams in England
Women's British Basketball League teams
Sport in Sheffield
Basketball teams established in 1961
1961 establishments in England